Hampton Township may refer to:

 Hampton Township, Lee County, Arkansas, in Lee County, Arkansas
 Hampton Township, Marion County, Arkansas, in Marion County, Arkansas
 Hampton Township, Rock Island County, Illinois
 Hampton Township, Michigan
 Hampton Township, Dakota County, Minnesota
 Hampton Township, New Jersey
 Hampton Township, Davidson County, North Carolina, in Davidson County, North Carolina
 Hampton Township, Allegheny County, Pennsylvania

See also
 New Hampton Township, Chickasaw County, Iowa

Township name disambiguation pages